Indian City is a Canadian folk-rock musical group best known for their 2017 Juno Award–nominated album Here & Now. Originally formed as a side project by Vince Fontaine of the band Eagle & Hawk, Indian City is a rotating collective of musicians sometimes described as "a sort of indigenous version of Broken Social Scene". Members and contributors have included Don Amero, William Prince, Jim Cuddy, Chantal Kreviazuk, Pamela Davis, Gabrielle Fontaine, Neewa Mason, Marty Chapman, Atik Mason, Gerry Atwell, Jamie Carrasco, Jay Bodner, Jeremy Koz, Rena Semenko, Steve Broadhurst, Rich Reid, and Shannon McKenney.

History
Indian City formed in 2012, and the band's debut album Supernation was released in August of that year, accompanied by a concert in Winnipeg, Manitoba. Supernation won Best Pop Album, and Amero won Male Entertainer of the Year for both his work with Indian City and his solo album Heart on My Sleeve, at that year's Aboriginal Peoples Choice Music Awards. They followed up with a second album, Colors, in 2013. In 2015 Indian City released a single, One Day, which reaches out to those having thoughts of suicide.

Here & Now, their third album, was released on 15 February 2017. The song, "Through the Flood", won Best Music video performance from the Native American Music Awards (NAMALIVE). Three of the songs from the album won the Indian Summer Music Awards in 2017: "Tree of Life" as Best Country; "Seasons" as Best Pop; and "Here & Now" as Best Rock.  The album was nominated for the 2018 Indigenous Music Album of the Year for the Juno Awards. One of the songs on this album, "Through the Flood", features Don Amero and directly addresses the issues of missing and murdered Indigenous women and girls in Canada. In 2018 the band performed at a concert to raise awareness of the issue.

Code Red, their fourth album, was released during the fall of 2021. This album featured guest artists Jim Cuddy, Chantal Kreviazuk, and Don Amero. However, in January 2022 their band leader, Vince Fontaine, passed away from a sudden heart attack. The band decided to continue with Code Red, and the album was re-released by Warner Music Canada on 30 September 2022, the National Day for Truth and Reconciliation. Code Red was nominated for Contemporary Indigenous Artist or Group of the Year for the 2022 Juno Awards.

See also
 Indigenous music of Canada

References

External links
 
 

2011 establishments in Canada
Canadian folk rock groups
First Nations musical groups
Juno Award for Indigenous Music Album of the Year winners
Musical groups established in 2011
Musical groups from Winnipeg